The Men's 200 metre breaststroke competition at the 2019 World Championships was held on 25 and 26 July 2019.

Records
Prior to the competition, the existing world and championship records were as follows.

The following new records were set during this competition.

Results

Heats
The heats were held on 25 July at 11:08.

Semifinals
The semifinals were held on 25 July at 20:44.

Semifinal 1

Semifinal 2

Final
The final was held on 26 July at 21:26.

References

Men's 200 metre breaststroke